The Roman Catholic Diocese of Abomey is a diocese located in the city of Abomey in the Ecclesiastical province of Cotonou in Benin.

History
 5 April 1963: Established as Diocese of Abomey from the Metropolitan Archdiocese of Cotonou and Diocese of Porto Novo

Bishops
 Bishops of Abomey (Roman rite), in reverse chronological order
 Bishop Eugène Cyrille Houndékon: 20 December 2007–present
 Bishop René-Marie Ehuzu, C.I.M.: 25 November 2002  – 3 January 2007, appointed Bishop of Porto Novo
 Bishop Lucien Monsi-Agboka: 5 April 1963  – 25 November 2002

Other priest of this diocese who became bishop
Barthélemy Adoukonou, appointed titular bishop of Zama Minor in 2011 (had already been appointed Secretary of the Pontifical Council for Culture)

See also
 Roman Catholicism in Benin

References

External links
 GCatholic.org 

Roman Catholic dioceses in Benin
Christian organizations established in 1963
Roman Catholic dioceses and prelatures established in the 20th century
Roman Catholic Ecclesiastical Province of Cotonou